Kazansky District  is an administrative district (raion), one of the twenty-two in Tyumen Oblast, Russia. As a municipal division, it is incorporated as Kazansky Municipal District. It is located in the south of the oblast. Its administrative center is the rural locality (a selo) of Kazanskoye. Population: 22,490 (2010 Census);  The population of Kazanskoye accounts for 26.4% of the district's total population.

Geography
Kazansky District is located in the south of Tyumen Oblast, on the border with Kazakhstan.  The terrain is rolling plain with a forest-steppe landscape.  The Ishim River runs south-to-north through the middle of the district.  About 25% of the area is forested, and about 25% is cropland, and another 35% is pasture and other agricultural land.  There are 140 lakes in the district, reflecting the flat terrain and low runoff.  The administrative center is the town of Kazanskoye.  Kazansky District is 280 km southeast of the city of Tyumen, 124 km north of the city of Petropavl, Kazakhstan, and 1,950 km east of Moscow.  The nearest train station is 60 km away in Ishim, Tyumen Oblast.  The area measures 57 km (north-south), 65 km (west-east); total area is 3,100 km2 (about 0.003% of Tyumen Oblast).

The district is bordered on the north by Ishimsky District, on the east by Sladkovsky District, on the south by Kazakhstan, and on the west by Berdyuzhsky District.

History
The first small settlement of Russians occurred in the mid-1700s.  The area at the time was on the frontier, exposed to raids by local nomadic tribes.  A military fort was built in the late 1700s, extending the fortified area south.  Thereafter, settlements of Russian farmers increased dramatically, drawn by the fertile soil and abundant lakes for fishing.

Kazansky District was officially formed in July 1931.

References

Notes

Sources

Districts of Tyumen Oblast